The SAP Center at San Jose (originally known as San Jose Arena and the HP Pavilion at San Jose) is an indoor arena located in San Jose, California. Its primary tenant is the San Jose Sharks of the National Hockey League, for which the arena has earned the nickname "The Shark Tank".

History
Plans for a San Jose arena began in the mid-1980s, when a group of local citizens formed Fund Arena Now (FAN). The group contacted city officials and pursued potential sponsors and partners from the NHL and NBA. In the late 1980s, mayor Tom McEnery met with FAN, and subsequently a measure to allocate local taxes for arena construction came up for a public vote on June 7, 1988, passing by a narrow margin.

In 1991, soon after construction began, the NHL granted an expansion franchise to San Jose. After it was discovered that the arena would not be suitable for NBA or NHL use as originally designed, the Sharks requested an upgrade to NHL standards, including the addition of luxury suites, a press box, and increased seating capacity.

In 1993, the arena was completed and initially named the "San Jose Arena".

For the 1996–97 NBA season, the arena served as home to the Golden State Warriors while their regular home court in Oakland (now known as Oakland Arena) was under renovation.

In 2001, naming rights were sold to Compaq, and it was renamed "Compaq Center at San Jose" (not to be confused with the Compaq Center (formerly The Summit) in Houston, Texas). After HP purchased Compaq in 2002, the arena was renamed "HP Pavilion", the same name as one of its computer models.

In late April 2007, it was announced that the HP Pavilion at San Jose would be receiving several building improvements, including a new center-hung LED video display system from Daktronics similar to that of the TD Garden, home of the Boston Bruins of the NHL.

In June 2013, German software company SAP (co-founded by Sharks managing partner Hasso Plattner, who is also SAP's chairman of the board) purchased the naming rights to the facility in a five-year deal worth US$3.35 million per year. The arena was renamed "SAP Center at San Jose" upon approval by the San Jose City Council.

Events
In 2006, the SAP Center sold the most tickets (633,435) to non-sporting events of any venue in the Western United States, and the fourth highest total in the world, after Madison Square Garden in New York City (US), the Manchester Arena in Manchester (UK), and Scotiabank Arena in Toronto (Canada).

Other events hosted at the arena include the 1996 United States Figure Skating Championships, the 47th National Hockey League All-Star Game in 1997, the 1999 NCAA Women's Final Four, ArenaBowl XVI in 2002, the 2007 USA Gymnastics Visa Championships, and UFC 139 on November 19, 2011. Intel Extreme Masters Season IX – San Jose in 2014 and Intel Extreme Masters Season X – San Jose were held at the venue. Prior to Super Bowl 50 in nearby Santa Clara, the arena housed introductory media activities for the event. The SAP Center hosted games 3, 4, and 6 of the 2016 Stanley Cup Finals in the Sharks' first appearance in franchise history, with the Cup being presented to the series-winning Pittsburgh Penguins after game 6. In 2012 and 2016, the arena played host to the USA Gymnastics Olympic Trials. The arena was the host to the West Regional semifinals and finals of the 2002, 2007, and 2017 NCAA men's basketball tournaments; as well as first- and second-round games of the 2010, 2013, and 2019 tournaments.

Mixed Martial Arts events have played a big role at the SAP Center. The MMA organization Strikeforce held many events in San Jose beginning with Strikeforce: Shamrock vs. Gracie in 2006, then Strikeforce: Carano vs. Cyborg in 2009, through 2012 with Strikeforce: Barnett vs. Cormier. The first Bellator MMA organization event at SAP was Bellator MMA & Glory: Dynamite 1 in September 2015 and since has held 6 total events with the most recent being Bellator 199 on May 16, 2018. SAP Center has also been the host of premiere MMA promotion the UFC. The first event was UFC 139 on November 19, 2011, then UFC on Fuel TV: Muñoz vs. Weidman on July 11, 2012, UFC on Fox: Henderson vs. Melendez on April 20, 2013, and most recently UFC on Fox: Lawler vs. Brown on July 26, 2014.

On September 18, 2016, the arena hosted the Kellogg's Tour of Gymnastics Champions.

The annual US Figure Skating Championships have been staged here in San Jose five times now -- 1996, 2012, 2018, 2021 and 2023.

SAP Center has also hosted WWE Pay Per Views. Royal Rumble (1998), SummerSlam (2001), The Great American Bash (2007), Payback (2017) took place where Braun Strowman defeated Roman Reigns in the main event. TLC: Tables, Ladders & Chairs (2018) took place at SAP Center.

Gallery

References

External links

1993 establishments in California
Former National Basketball Association venues
Sports venues completed in 1993
Indoor ice hockey venues in California
Mixed martial arts venues in California
National Hockey League venues
Sports venues in San Jose, California
Sports venues in the San Francisco Bay Area
Music venues completed in 1993
Defunct indoor soccer venues in the United States
Gymnastics venues in California
Indoor lacrosse venues in the United States
Indoor arenas in California
Tennis venues in California
Music venues in the San Francisco Bay Area
San Jose Barracuda
Esports venues in California
San Jose Sharks